The 1924 Utah State Aggies football team was an American football team that represented Utah State Agricultural College—now known as Utah State University—as a member of the Rocky Mountain Conference (RMC) during the 1924 college football season. In their sixth season under head coach Dick Romney, the Aggies compiled an overall record of 4–2–1 record with mark of 3–2–1 against conference opponents, finished in a three-way tie for second place in the RMC, and outscored opponents by a total of 127 to 52.

Schedule

References

Utah Agricultural
Utah State Aggies football seasons
Utah State Aggies football